Tranteeva is a genus of harvestmen belonging to the family Sironidae.

Species:
 Tranteeva paradoxa Kratochvil, 1958

References

Harvestmen